Aurel Amzucu (born 6 May 1974) is a Romanian former professional footballer who played as a defender for teams such as Petrolul Țicleni, Minerul Motru, Pandurii Târgu Jiu, FC Oradea or FCM Reșița, among others.

Honours
Pandurii Târgu Jiu
Divizia C: Winner 1999–2000

References

External links
 

1974 births
Living people
People from Gorj County
Romanian footballers
Association football defenders
Liga I players
Liga II players
Liga III players
CS Minerul Motru players
CS Pandurii Târgu Jiu players
FC Bihor Oradea players
CSM Reșița players
FC Drobeta-Turnu Severin players